Peutz–Jeghers syndrome (often abbreviated PJS) is an autosomal dominant genetic disorder characterized by the development of benign hamartomatous polyps in the gastrointestinal tract and hyperpigmented macules on the lips and oral mucosa (melanosis). This syndrome can be classed as one of various hereditary intestinal polyposis syndromes and one of various hamartomatous polyposis syndromes. It has an incidence of approximately 1 in 25,000 to 300,000 births.

Signs and symptoms
The risks associated with this syndrome include a substantial risk of cancer, especially of the breast  and gastrointestinal tracts. Colorectal is the most common malignancy, with a lifetime risk of 39 percent, followed by breast cancer in females with a lifetime risk of 32 to 54 percent.

Patients with the syndrome also have an increased risk of developing carcinomas of the liver, lungs, breast, ovaries, uterus, testes, and other organs. Specifically, it is associated with an increased risk of sex-cord stromal tumor with annular tubules in the ovaries.

Due to the increased risk of malignancies, direct surveillance is recommended.

The average age of first diagnosis is 23. The first presentation is often bowel obstruction or intussuseption from the hamartomatous gastrointestinal polyps. Dark blue, brown, and black pigmented mucocutaneous macules, are present in over 95 percent of individuals with Peutz-Jeghers syndrome. Pigmented lesions are rarely present at birth, but often appear before 5 years of age. The macules may fade during puberty. The melanocytic macules are not associated with malignant transformation.

Complications associated with Peutz-Jeghers syndrome include obstruction and intussusception, which occur in up to 69 percent of patients, typically first between the ages of 6 and 18, though surveillance for them is controversial. Anemia is also common due to gastrointestinal bleeding from the polyps.

Genetics
In 1998, a gene was found to be associated with the mutation. On chromosome 19, the gene known as STK11 (LKB1) is a possible tumor suppressor gene. It is inherited in an autosomal dominant pattern, which means that anyone who has PJS has a 50% chance of passing the disease on to their offspring.

Peutz–Jeghers syndrome is rare and studies typically include only a small number of patients.  Even in those few studies that do contain a large number of patients, the quality of the evidence is limited due to pooling patients from many centers, selection bias (only patients with health problems coming from treatment are included), and historical bias (the patients reported are from a time before advances in the diagnosis of treatment of Peutz–Jeghers syndrome were made). Probably due to this limited evidence base, cancer risk estimates for Peutz–Jeghers syndrome vary from study to study. There is an estimated 18–21% risk of ovarian cancer, 9% risk of endometrial cancer, and 10% risk of cervical cancer, specifically adenoma malignum.

Diagnosis

The main criteria for clinical diagnosis are:
 Family history
 Mucocutaneous lesions causing patches of hyperpigmentation in the mouth and on the hands and feet.  The oral pigmentations are the first on the body to appear, and thus play an important part in early diagnosis.  Intraorally, they are most frequently seen on the gingiva, hard palate and inside of the cheek.  The mucosa of the lower lip is almost invariably involved as well.
 Hamartomatous polyps in the gastrointestinal tract.  These are benign polyps with an extraordinarily low potential for malignancy.

Having 2 of the 3 listed clinical criteria indicates a positive diagnosis.  The oral findings are consistent with other conditions, such as Addison's disease and McCune–Albright syndrome, and these should be included in the differential diagnosis.  90–100% of patients with a clinical diagnosis of PJS have a mutation in the STK11/LKB1 gene. Molecular genetic testing for this mutation is available clinically.

Management
Resection of the polyps is required only if serious bleeding or intussusception occurs. Enterotomy is performed for removing large, single nodules. Short lengths of heavily involved intestinal segments can be resected. Colonoscopy can be used to snare the polyps if they are within reach.

Prognosis

Most patients will develop flat, brownish spots (melanotic macules) on the skin, especially on the lips and oral mucosa, during the first year of life, and a patient's first bowel obstruction due to intussusception usually occurs between the ages of six and 18 years. The cumulative lifetime cancer risk begins to rise in middle age. Cumulative risks by age 70 for all cancers, gastrointestinal (GI) cancers, and pancreatic cancer are 85%, 57%, and 11%, respectively.

A 2011 Dutch study followed 133 patients for 14 years. The cumulative risk for cancer was 40% and 76% at ages 40 and 70, respectively. 42 (32%) of the patients died during the study, of which 28 (67%) were cancer related. They died at a median age of 45. Mortality was increased compared with the general population.

A family with sinonasal polyposis were followed up for 28 years. Two cases of sinonasal type adenocarcinoma developed. This is a rare cancer. This report suggested that follow up of sinus polyps in this syndrome may be indicated.

Monitoring

Some suggestions for surveillance for cancer include the following:
 Small intestine with small bowel radiography every 2 years,
 Esophagogastroduodenoscopy and colonoscopy every 2 years,
 CT scan or MRI of the pancreas yearly,
 Ultrasound of the pelvis and testes yearly
 Mammography from age 25 annually
 Papanicolaou smear (Pap smear) annually beginning at age 18-20

Follow-up care should be supervised by a physician familiar with Peutz–Jeghers syndrome. Genetic consultation and counseling as well as urological and gynecological consultations are often needed.

Eponym
First described in a published case report in 1921 by Jan Peutz (1886–1957), a Dutch Internist, it was later formalized into the syndrome by American physicians at Boston City Hospital, Harold Joseph Jeghers (1904–1990) and Kermit Harry Katz (1914–2003), and Victor Almon McKusick (1921–2008) in 1949 and published in the New England Journal of Medicine.

See also
 List of cutaneous conditions
 Sex cord tumour with annular tubules

References

External links

  GeneReviews/NCBI/NIH/UW entry on Peutz-Jeghers syndrome
 Peutz-Jeghers syndrome – Genetics Home Reference

Autosomal dominant disorders
Gastrointestinal tract disorders
Deficiencies of intracellular signaling peptides and proteins
Gynaecological neoplasia
Syndromes affecting the gastrointestinal tract
Urological conditions
Disturbances of human pigmentation
Melanocytic nevi and neoplasms
Oral mucosal pathology
Diseases named for discoverer